Cyana flammeostrigata is a moth in the family Erebidae. It was described by Timm Karisch in 2003. It is found in Cameroon, Equatorial Guinea, Kenya, Nigeria and Uganda.

References

flammeostrigata
Moths described in 2003
Moths of Africa